Animal Fair may refer to:
 "Animal Fair" (song)
 Animal Fair (magazine)